"Living and Living Well" is a song written by Tony Martin, Mark Nesler and Tom Shapiro, and recorded by American country music artist George Strait.  It was released in February 2002 as the second single from his album The Road Less Traveled.  The song reached number one on the U.S. Billboard Hot Country Singles & Tracks in June 2002.  It also peaked at number 27 on the Billboard Hot 100, making it a minor crossover hit.

Content
The narrator says that there's a difference in "living and living well", and the difference is when you're with your significant other.

Chart positions
"Living and Living Well" debuted at number 59 on the U.S. Billboard Hot Country Singles & Tracks for the week of February 16, 2002.

Year-end charts

References

2002 singles
2001 songs
George Strait songs
Songs written by Tom Shapiro
Songs written by Mark Nesler
Song recordings produced by Tony Brown (record producer)
Songs written by Tony Martin (songwriter)
MCA Nashville Records singles